Super Show 8: Infinite Time is the fifth Asia-wide concert tour and eighth tour overall by South Korean boy band Super Junior, in support of their ninth studio album, Time_Slip. The world tour commenced with two shows in Seoul from October 12–13, 2019.

This tour marks the return of member Kyuhyun, who had been away serving two years of mandatory military service.

On August 30, Label SJ announced that Heechul would not be joining the tour due to ongoing health issues.

Concerts 
On August 27, 2019, Super Junior announced their dates for the tour Super Show 8, before the promotion of their ninth studio album, Time_Slip. On October 14, 2019, It was announced that the seats of their concert, which held in KSPO Dome on October 12–13, was sold out. It attracted 18,000 viewers for the two days.

On February 10, 2020, the tour promoter for the Malaysia stop, StarPlanet 星艺娱乐 released a statement that they will postpone the concert due to coronavirus proliferation concerns.

On May 31, 2020, Super Junior performed a special online live concert dubbed Beyond the Super Show, and was broadcast via Naver's V Live app as part of a joint project between SM and Naver called Beyond Live. Beyond Live concerts featured interactive fanlight sequences, augmented stage graphics, and multi-cam support for the fans who wanted to focus on one specific member. Lucky audience members were able to show their faces to Super Junior in real-time using webcams. Beyond Live was not locked to a specific region or country, so international audience members could watch it at the same time as Korea. Beyond the Super Show featured the same 8-member lineup as Super Show 8: Infinite Time and featured MAX from TVXQ as a special webcam guest.

Setlist

Tour dates

Cancelled shows

Personnel
 Artists: Super Junior members Leeteuk, Heechul, Yesung, Shindong, Eunhyuk, Donghae, Siwon, Ryeowook, Kyuhyun
 Tour organizer: SM Entertainment
 Tour promoter: Dream Maker Entertainment Limited, SM True Thailand, StarMac Entertainment Production Ltd, Pulp Live World, Dyandra Global Edutainment, Live Nation Global Touring

References

External links 

 Dream Maker Entertainment Limited 
 Super Junior Official Homepage 
 Super Junior Official Homepage (in Japanese)

2019 concert tours
2020 concert tours
Concert tours postponed due to the COVID-19 pandemic
Super Junior concert tours
K-pop concerts